Lorenzo Delleani (1840 – 1908) was an Italian painter.

Biography

He was born in Pollone in the province of Biella, Piedmont. He was a pupil of Enrico Gamba and Carlo Arienti at the Albertina Academy in Turin, Delleani worked initially in the field of history painting and received various marks of official recognition. He exhibited work at the Paris Salon of 1874 and gradually modernised his means of expression and range of subjects at the end of the decade with a new focus on landscape and painting from life. The early 1880s saw an exclusive focus on painting en plein air, capturing light in thick strokes of colour. His most frequent subjects were views of the Piedmontese and Lombard countryside in changing conditions of light and season. 

He also painted some genre scenes depicting devotional pilgrimages to mountain shrines, such as in Pilgrimage to Oropa on display in Asti.

The artist’s presentation of some 40 works at the Venice Biennale in 1905 and participation in the International Exhibition in Munich of the same year set the seal on his international success. He died in Turin. Among his pupils were Giuseppe Bozzalla and Giuseppe Buscaglione.

He collaborated in painting with his brother, Celestino Delleani (1850-1873), who died young.

References

 Elena Lissoni, Lorenzo Delleani, online catalogue Artgate by Fondazione Cariplo, 2010, CC BY-SA (source for the first revision of this article).

Other projects

 Delleani works at Galleria Civica d'Arte Moderna.

19th-century Italian painters
Italian male painters
20th-century Italian painters
Italian landscape painters
Accademia Albertina alumni
Painters from Piedmont
1840 births
1908 deaths
19th-century Italian male artists
20th-century Italian male artists